The Arun River is a trans-boundary river and is part of the Kosi or Sapt Koshi river system in Nepal. It originates in Tibet Autonomous Region of the People's Republic of China where it is called the Phung Chu or Bum-chu.

Name
In Tibet, the river is called Bum-chu, also transliterated Phung-Chu or from Chinese as Peng Qu or Pumqu.  Men Qu or Moinqu is an upper tributary draining glaciers from Shishapangma. In Nepal the river's name changes to Arun.

Tibet
The Tibetan name Bum-chu may refer to a religious ceremony attempting to divine prospects for the coming year from the level of water in a pot or well, chu is the Tibetan word for water. The river originates near Gutso in Nyalam County of Tibet. The Tingri county occupies the upper reaches of the Bum-chu and the lateral valleys formed by its tributaries, the foremost of which are Lolo-chu, Shel-chu, Rongpu-chu, Trakar-chu, Kharda-chu, Ra-chu Tsangpo, and Langkor Gya-chu. The Yeru Tsanpo converges with Bum-chu in Tingkye County, which accommodates the lower Bum-chu valley. Another river that meets Bum-chu is Trakar-chu. The river flows past the town of Kharda, gateway to the Khangzhung east face of Everest. The force of its accumulated waters carves its way, south of Drengtrang, through the main chain of the Himalayas directly between the mountain massifs of Makalu and Kangchenjunga into Nepal.

Kosi River System
The Kosi or Sapta Koshi drains eastern Nepal. It is known as Sapt Koshi because of the seven rivers which join in east-central Nepal to form this river. The main rivers forming the Koshi system are – the Sun Kosi, the Indravati River, the Bhoté Koshi, the Dudh Kosi, the Arun River, Barun River, and Tamur River. The combined river flows through the Chatra Gorge in a southerly direction to emerge from the hills.

The Sun Kosi contributes 44 per cent of the total water in the Sapta Koshi, the Arun 37 per cent and the Tamur 19 per cent.

Nepal
The Arun is the largest trans-Himalayan river passing through Nepal and also has the greatest snow and ice-covered area of any Nepalese river basin. The Arun drains more than half of the area contributing to the Sapta Kosi river system but provides only about a quarter of the total discharge. This apparent contradiction is caused by the location of more than 80 percent of the Arun's drainage area in the rain shadow of the Himalayas.

Leaving their rain shadow, the river's flow increases substantially in the monsoonal climate of east Nepal. The landscape south of the border tends to be steep with less than 15 percent of the area having a sustained slope of less than 15° and is strongly dissected by stream channels. Many of the hill slopes are structurally unstable, and the region is seismically active. The August 1988 Nepal earthquake, with an epicentre more than 50 km south of the Arun basin, had a moment magnitude of 6.9 and resulted in more than 100 deaths in the basin alone.

The vegetation in the southern two-thirds of the area has been extensively modified for subsistence agriculture.

References

External links
 Arun River, OpenStreetMap, retrieved 19 December 2021.
 Sun Kosi River, OpenStreetMap, retrieved 19 December 2021.
 Sapta Kosi River, OpenStreetMap, retrieved 19 December 2021.

Rivers of Koshi Province
Rivers of Tibet
International rivers of Asia